Paleospinacidae is an extinct family of prehistoric sharks in the extinct order Synechodontiformes.

References

External links 

Prehistoric cartilaginous fish families
 
Permian first appearances
Paleogene extinctions